William Farrar may refer to:

 William Farrar (American football), American football official, player and coach
 William H. Farrar (1826–1873), mayor of Portland, Oregon
 William Farrar (settler), early US settler and member of the King's Council